1 E4 may refer to:

10000 (number), the natural number following 9999 and preceding 10001
In chess openings, the opening move 1.e4 (see King's Pawn Game)